Mary Lou Turner (born June 13, 1947) is an American country music artist. She began her career as a regular on the Wheeling Jamboree in the early 1970s and in 1974 signed to replace Jan Howard as the "girl singer" (who had left to pursue her solo career full-time) on The Bill Anderson Show, both his touring show and syndicated TV series. Between 1976 and 1977 she recorded two duet albums with Bill Anderson, and charted four duets with him. One of their duets, "Sometimes", reached No. 1 in 1976. Turner also charted two solo Top 40 country singles in 1976, and several more solo singles.

Discography

Albums
Both albums recorded with Bill Anderson.

Solo singles

Duets with Bill Anderson

References

External links
[ Mary Lou Turner] at Allmusic

1947 births
American women country singers
American country singer-songwriters
Country musicians from Kentucky
Living people
People from Hazard, Kentucky
MCA Records artists
Singer-songwriters from Kentucky
Kentucky women musicians
Singers from Kentucky